Les Fugitives is a London-based independent publisher. They principally publish short works by Francophone female authors that have previously not been published in English translation. Their titles have won many awards and include:

 Suite for Barbara Loden by Nathalie Léger
Translated by Natasha Lehrer and Cécile Menon. Winner of the Scott Moncrieff Prize 2016, shortlisted for the French-American Foundation Translation Prize 2017 and longlisted for the Albertine Prize 2017.

 Eve Out of Her Ruins by Ananda Devi 
Translated by Jeffrey Zuckerman. Winner of the Prix des cinq continents de la Francophonie 2006 and winner of the CLMP Firecracker Award in Fiction 2017. Finalist for the inaugural TA First Translation Prize 2018, the Albertine Prize 2017, and the Best Translated Book Award 2017.

 Blue Self-Portrait by Noémi Lefebvre 
Translated by Sophie Lewis. Shortlisted for the Republic of Consciousness Prize for Small Presses 2018 and for the Scott Moncrieff Prize 2018.

 Translation as Transhumance by Mireille Gansel 
Translated by Ros Schwartz. Winner of an English PEN Award 2017 and a French Voices Award 2015. Longlisted for the Jan Michalski Foundation Literature Prize 2013.

 NOW, NOW, LOUISON by Jean Frémon
Translated by Cole Swensen
Longlisted for the Republic of Consciousness Prize for Small Presses 2019

 The Governesses by Anne Serre
Translated by Mark Hutchinson

 Selfies by Sylvie Weil
Translated by Ros Schwartz

 This Tilting World by Colette Fellous
Translated by Sophie Lewis

 The Living Days by Ananda Devi
Translated by Jeffrey Zuckerman

 A Respectable Occupation by Julia Kerninon
Translated by Ruth Diver

 Little Dancer Aged Fourteen by Camille Laurens
Translated by Willard Wood

 Exposition by Nathalie Léger
Translated by Amanda DeMarco

 La Robe Blanche by Nathalie Léger
Translated by Natasha Lehrer

References

Book publishing companies based in London